Bhupendrasinh was Cabinet Education Minister  (Primary, Secondary and Adult), Higher and Technical Education, Law and Justice, Legislative and Parliamentary affairs, Salt Industry, Cow-Breeding and Civil Aviation in the Second Vijay Rupani cabinet.

On 12 May 2020, the Gujarat High Court declared that the 2017 election of Chudasama was invalid. The proceedings were stayed by the Supreme Court a few days later.

References

Year of birth missing (living people)
Living people
Place of birth missing (living people)
Bharatiya Janata Party politicians from Gujarat
Gujarat MLAs 2012–2017
Gujarat MLAs 2017–2022
State cabinet ministers of Gujarat